Thomas Drinkwater Chataway (6 April 1864 – 5 March 1925) was an English-born Australian politician. Born in Wartling, Sussex, he was educated at Charterhouse School before migrating to Australia in 1881, where he became a grazier and sugar mill-owner in New South Wales and then Queensland. He was a leader among Queensland cane growers, sitting on Mackay Council and serving as mayor in 1904. In 1906 he was elected to the Australian Senate as an Anti-Socialist Senator for Queensland. He joined the Commonwealth Liberal Party when it formed in 1909. Chataway was defeated in 1913, after which he became a journalist in Melbourne.

References

Free Trade Party members of the Parliament of Australia
Commonwealth Liberal Party members of the Parliament of Australia
Members of the Australian Senate for Queensland
Members of the Australian Senate
Journalists from Melbourne
1864 births
1925 deaths
People educated at Charterhouse School
20th-century Australian politicians
People from Wealden District